Brachyponera luteipes is a species of ant of the subfamily Ponerinae. It is found in Nicobar Islands, Japan, Philippines, Indonesia, Sri Lanka, Myanmar, India, and Vietnam. Two subspecies are recognized.

Subspecies
 Brachyponera luteipes continentalis Karavaiev, 1925 - India
 Brachyponera luteipes luteipes Karavaiev, 1925 - New Zealand, Borneo, Palau, Philippines, Bangladesh, India, Myanmar, Nicobar Islands, Sri Lanka, Thailand, Vietnam, China, Japan

References

External links
 at antwiki.org
Animaldiversity.org

Ponerinae
Hymenoptera of Asia
Insects described in 1862